Vicente Ehate Tomi (born 1968) is an Equatoguinean politician who was Prime Minister of Equatorial Guinea from 21 May 2012 until 22 June 2016. He was removed from office on 2016 and then jailed for life on corruption charges.

References 

1968 births
Democratic Party of Equatorial Guinea politicians
Living people
Prime Ministers of Equatorial Guinea